William Craven Craven-Ellis (1880 – 17 December 1959), born William Craven Ellis, was a Conservative Party politician in the United Kingdom.

Ellis was educated at Manchester Grammar School, and became a senior partner of Ellis & Sons, Valuers and Surveyors.  He assumed the name Craven-Ellis by deed poll in 1931.

In the 1929 general election, he unsuccessfully contested the safe Labour-held seat of Barnsley, where he came third with only 15% of the votes. In the 1931 general election, he was elected as Member of Parliament (MP) for Southampton, and held the seat until his defeat in the 1945 general election. In the House of Commons, he was chair of the Parliamentary Monetary Committee from 1934 to 1944.

Notes

References

External links 
 

1880 births
1959 deaths
Conservative Party (UK) MPs for English constituencies
Members of the Parliament of the United Kingdom for Southampton
UK MPs 1931–1935
UK MPs 1935–1945
People educated at Manchester Grammar School